The following is a list of games developed or published by the defunct Japanese computer and video game company, XTALSOFT.

Sharp MZ-700
 1983
 Holy Sword

Hitachi S1
 1985
 Lizard
 1986
 Heart of Phantasm II (夢幻の心臓II)

NEC PC-6001
 Dates Unknown
 Holy Sword
 Great Detective Appearance!
 Lizard
 Vandal
 Earthbound
 Aspic
 UFO Attack
 U-boat S.O.S.
 Newton's Power
 Green Beam
 Red Zone Killer
 Rush Hour Game
 ドッグファイター
 Wルービック　パネル
 レーザーワープ ゲーム
 バイキン・ウォーズ

PC-6001mkII
 1986
 Aspic

NEC PC-8801
 1983
 Holy Sword
 高速機動部隊
 1984
 Great Detective Appearance!
 Ninja Residence
 Grand Cross
 白伝説
 Lizard
 1985
 Fantasian
 Heart of Phantasm II (夢幻の心臓II)
 1986
 Heart of Phantasm II (夢幻の心臓II)
 Babylon

NEC PC-8801mkIISR
 1987
 Babylon
 Crimson
 Jehard
 Mr. Professional Baseball
 1988
 Battle Gorilla
 Advanced Fantasian
 1989
 Crimson II
 1990
 Heart of Phantasm III (夢幻の心臓III)
 Crimson III
 Dates Unknown
 Fantasian
 Lizard (computer game)
 白伝説
 Heart of Phantasm (夢幻の心臓)
 Heart of Phantasm II (夢幻の心臓II)

NEC PC-98
 1984
 Heart of Phantasm (夢幻の心臓)
 1986
 Heart of Phantasm II (夢幻の心臓II)

Fujitsu FM-7
 1983
 Holy Sword
 1984
 Earthbound
 Ninja Residence
 Grand Cross
 1986
 Heart of Phantasm II (夢幻の心臓II)

Fujitsu FM-77AV
 1986
 Aspic
 1987
 Babylon

Fujitsu FM-8
 1984
 Ninja Residence

Sharp X1
 1987
 Aspic Special
 Dates Unknown
 Heart of Phantasm II (夢幻の心臓II)

MSX
 1987
 Bolu Fez and 5 Evil Spirits

MSX2
 1989
 Crimson II
 1990
 Crimson III

Famicom Disk System
 1987
 Sword of Kalin
 1988
 Aspic

Commodore 64
 1989
 Curse of Babylon

XTALSOFT